Wang Xufeng (born 1955) is a Chinese writer and tea expert. She is a recipient of the Chinese Mao Dun Literature Prize.

Biography
Wang's ancestral hometown was in Tongshan, Jiangsu Province. Wang was born in Pinghu, Zhejiang Province in February 1955. She studied in the Department of History of Hangzhou University (currently Zhejiang University) between 1978 and 1982. After graduation, Wang taught at Hangzhou 14th Middle School. She also worked in a Hangzhou local factory manufacturing radio technology.

Wang is currently a researcher at China Tea Museum, a professor at Zhejiang Forestry University, and vice president of the Zhejiang Writers Association.

Works
Wang won the 5th Mao Dun Literature Prize for Three Trilogies of Teamen. The work took her ten years to write and is considered not only a story but also a scholarly work. The story is set against the history of China and deals with subjects like the Cultural Revolution. The theme of the book is the victory of culture over violence. The award was made on November 11, 2000 in Tongxiang, Zhejiang Province, where Mao Dun was born.

 (Trilogies of Teamen) 
  "The Story of the Carefree Tea Mansion"
  
 

Wang has also done many studies on tea and tea culture, such as:
  (Essays of Tea Culture)

References

External links
 Wang Xufeng's biography and works 
 Wang Xufeng's blog 
 Wang Xufeng's blog at Zhejiang BlogNet 

1955 births
Writers from Jiaxing
Zhejiang University alumni
Hangzhou University alumni
Living people
Chinese women novelists
Chinese novelists
Mao Dun Literature Prize laureates
People's Republic of China novelists
Educators from Jiaxing